Naukan can refer to:
 Naukan people, ethnic group in Northeastern Siberia
 Naukan Yupik language, their language
 Naukan (village), settlement in far eastern Russia
 Naukan, Iran (disambiguation), several settlements in Iran
 Naukan (crater), crater on Mars

See also
 Naukane, Hawaiian chief